Bekim Berisha (15 June 1966 – 10 August 1998) was a Kosovo Albanian soldier who gained prominence in the Yugoslav Wars. He served in the Croatian Army during the Croatian War of Independence. He subsequently fought in the Army of the Republic of Bosnia and Herzegovina, and later also in the Kosovo Liberation Army (KLA), where he was named a general. He was killed in 1998, during the Battle of Junik, and was posthumously promoted to Brigadier General.

Early years
Berisha was born and raised in Grabovac near Peć, SFR Yugoslavia (modern-day Graboc near Peja, Kosovo) as the youngest of six children of Fazli and Fahrije Berisha.

His grandfather Nexhip Selmani fought against Yugoslav authorities in Kosovo for decades. After attending secondary school in Peja, he decided to go to SR Croatia due to not being able to continue school in Kosovo. During his first period in Croatia, Bekim maintained mostly physical jobs to earn a living and send money back to the family in Kosovo. After a while, he also registered as a student in the Zagreb University studying as a veterinary. He finished his studies with success, also maintaining one of his favorite hobbies, military art and martial art. After a few years in Croatia, Bekim moved to the Netherlands where he got engaged and settled.

War in Croatia and Bosnia
When the Croatian War of Independence started, Bekim Berisha left his life in the West behind him at the age of 25, and came back to Croatia on 7 August 1991 to volunteer in the Croatian National Guard. He joined a battalion defending the twin villages of Donje Komarevo and Gornje Komarevo near Sisak. He later participated in battles of eastern Slavonia, in the front-lines against the JNA, before he was wounded there on 16 June 1992. He was discharged with a significant disability and lived in Opatija until 1996.

During the Croatian War he was also interviewed by BBC where he declared that Croatia within only a couple of months would be free of Serbian soldiers as the war went very well. Only days later, the final Croatian offensive began and Bekim was one of the front-line soldiers.

He also took part in the Bosnian War, during the battle of Kotorsko he was hit by six bullets on 15 June 1992. He was taken to a military hospital in Croatia and later returned to the front line once again.

Kosovo War

Only two years later, Bekim moved his attention towards helping the ethnic Albanian faction of Kosovo. The ethnic Albanians of Kosovo started organising themselves in military actions against the Yugoslavian authorities that were stationed in Kosovo. Bekim was one of the main organisers behind the early attacks of the Kosovo Liberation Army. During early 1998, he illegally entered Kosovo from Albania with several other militants who then settled themselves in a small town in the Drenica valley and started organising several attacks in the region. He was the main consultant and commander in the area, handling the training of the new recruits.

However, there were bigger problems in the western part of Kosovo (Dukagjin), his home region was coming under heavy pressure from the Yugoslav police. Together with his close friend and companion Bedri Shala, they traveled to Glogjan, a small town only minutes away from his native town of Graboc. There, they united with other KLA militants, amongst them Ramush Haradinaj and his brothers, and defended the village of Glogjan against a Yugoslavian police-raid. During the Battle of Glogjan, Bekim Berisha was seen as one of the most important figures of the KLA, he was responsible for the logistics, the communication and the movement of militants in and out of Glogjan.

The commander in chief of the region, Ramush Haradinaj, decided to place Bekim Berisha and Bedri Shala in the town of Junik. This small town had a strategic importance to both the KLA and the Yugoslavian Army. It was one of the main KLA strongholds during the war (largely due to Berisha and Shala's efforts against a much better equipped Yugoslav Army).

During the battle, he insisted on the re-organisation of the KLA, he demanded that the KLA should switch its strategy and launch a major offensive instead of fortressing themselves within the town of Junik. During May 1998, the authorities surrounded Junik from all sides and shelled it constantly with heavy artillery. During the relentless shelling, on 29 May 1998, his partner and closest friend, Bedri Shala was heavily wounded and taken back to the camp from the frontline. When Bekim got the news that Shala was dying, he went with several soldiers to the frontline and launched hit-and-run attacks against Yugoslav vehicles that had reached the southern part of Junik.

According to the surviving soldiers, Bekim Berisha was heavily touched by the death of Bedri Shala. Unlike in other battles, Berisha maintained no radio contact with his commanding officer, instead he and several other soldiers settled down in a small house that was located perhaps one hundred meters from the Yugoslav positions and confronted his enemy with sniper and RPG fire.

After hours of fighting, the Yugoslavs decided to call in a tank for support. Once it arrived, it neared the house in which Berisha and the other KLA militants were holed up in and launched a projectile that went on to tear Berisha's right arm off of his body, wounding him mortally.

Elton Zherka, Përmet Vula and Bashkim Lekaj fell on the same spot, a helpless Berisha was taken back to the KLA's makeshift headquarters in the center of Junik and died the same day as his friend Bedri Shala. Only days after his death, Junik fell into the hands of the Yugoslav authorities.

Legacy

Berisha was buried in Junik, but later re-buried in his home town of Graboc, he was granted the military title and rank of Brigadier General by the Kosovo Protection Corps (KPC).

According to witnesses, the Croatian President Franjo Tuđman reportedly mourned the loss of Berisha, claiming he was “a one man army, that Croatia and Kosovo would be eternally proud of”.

His former General in Croatia, Janko Bobetko also cried talking about Berisha during a documentary about Bekims life. Claiming he was “one of the best men and soldiers he has ever gotten in touch with”. “Bekim was really unique, I don’t think anyone in Croatia nor Kosova really known the value that he had to the Independence war against Serbia. You should be proud that he was a member of your nation”.

Several streets, schools and other institutions carry his name today in Kosovo.

In August 2010, Berisha was posthumously awarded the Hero of Kosovo.

Ivica Pandža, a retired Colonel of the Croatian Army, who had served with Berisha, started investigating Berisha's legacy in 2007. He tracked down Berisha's lost documents in Komarevo that led to the finding of Berisha's Homeland War Memorial Medal in the archives of the Ministry of Defence. In 2013, Berisha was posthumously awarded the Order of the Croatian Cross.

Annotations

References

External links

1966 births
1998 deaths
Albanian nationalists in Kosovo
Kosovan soldiers
Military personnel of the Croatian War of Independence
Croatian army officers
Army of the Republic of Bosnia and Herzegovina soldiers
Kosovo Liberation Army soldiers
Faculty of Veterinary Medicine, University of Zagreb alumni
Order of Nikola Šubić Zrinski recipients
20th-century Albanian military personnel
20th-century Albanian people
Kosovo Albanians
Military personnel from Peja
Croatian independence activists
Croatian people of Albanian descent
Croatian people of Kosovan descent